The 1948 New Mexico Lobos football team represented the University of New Mexico in the Border Conference during the 1948 college football season.  In their second season under head coach Berl Huffman, the Lobos compiled a 2–9 record (1–6 against conference opponents), finished eighth in the Border Conference, and were outscored by opponents by a total of 216 to 146.

Schedule

References

New Mexico
New Mexico Lobos football seasons
New Mexico Lobos football